A Cryogenic processor is a unit designed to reach ultra-low temperatures (usually around −300 °F / −150 °C) at a slow rate in order to prevent thermal shock to the components being treated. The first commercial unit was developed by Ed Busch in the late 1960s.  The development of programmable microprocessor controls allowed the machines to follow temperature profiles that greatly increased the effectiveness of the process. Some manufacturers make cryoprocessors with home computers to define the temperature profile.

Before programmable controls were added to control cryogenic processors, the "treatment" process of an object was previously done manually by immersing the object in liquid nitrogen. This normally caused thermal shock to occur within an object, resulting in cracks to the structure. Modern cryogenic processors measure changes in temperature and adjust the input of liquid nitrogen accordingly to ensure that only small fractional changes in temperature occur over a long period of time. Their temperature measurements and adjustments are condensed into "profiles" that are used to repeat the process in a certain way when treating for similarly grouped objects.

The general processing cycle for modern cryogenic processors occurs within a three-day time window, with 24 hours to reach the optimal bottom temperature for a product, 24 hours to hold at the bottom temperature, and 24 hours to return to room temperature. Depending on the product, some items will be heated in an oven to even higher temperatures. Some processors are capable of providing both the negative and positive extreme temperatures, separate units (a cryogenic processor and a dedicated oven) can sometimes produce better results depending upon the application.

The optimal bottom temperatures for objects, as well as the hold times involved, are determined utilizing a number of different research methods and backed by experience and analysis to determine what works the best for a given product. As new metals are used in different combinations for newer products on the market, processing profiles change to accommodate the changes in structure. Also, profiles will sometimes undergo change from the results of a case study brought to attention by a large manufacturer or consumer of cryogenic services. Generally when a manufacturer sells a cryogenic processor they include the profiles for only that year of manufacture, or, more typically, profiles from when the processor model was first engineered, which sometimes will date back several years. Many businesses will include outdated profiles simply because they do not have adequate funding to perform the necessary ongoing research.

For people looking to find thermal profiles for cryogenics, a number of companies maintain thermal profiles of various products that are updated for accuracy at least a few times a year with their ongoing research, including data from independent trials and studies. However, obtaining these profiles is sometimes difficult if they are not used for educational purposes (mainly institutional research), as they typically only provide the updated profiles to their longtime "service center" partners around the world.

Overall, cryogenic processors are radically changing the way that cryogenics used to be done. Many years ago, cryogenics was simply theoretical, with spotty results when there were improvements. Now, cryogenic processors are ensuring the accurate and consistent results for all products that are treated these days. As the technology sector improves, cryogenic processors will only get better as they benefit from new computer systems. Ongoing research in the future will also improve their temperature treatment profiles.

See also 
 Absolute zero
 Cryogenics
 Cryogenic tempering
 Cryocoolers
 Coldest temperature achieved on earth
 Refrigeration
 Superfluidity
 Superconductivity
 Quantum hydrodynamics

References

External links 
 300 Below, Inc. - Founder: Peter Paulin
 Cryotron (Canada) Ltd. - Developer: Vari-Cold Cryogenic Process

Cryogenics